The Woman's Exchange Movement (or Women's Exchange Movement) refers to a system of benevolent consignment stores, usually established and managed by women, to benefit women. A number of them are members of the Federation of Woman's Exchanges (1934), which is still active.

Background
The Woman's Exchange Movement in the United States dates to 1832, with the establishment of the Philadelphia Ladies' Depository.

Exchanges are non-profit establishments. In the 19th century they were mainly set up by philanthropic women, providing a setting for women to sell their embroidery, sewing, and fancywork. This allowed women to earn a living without working outside their homes. Initially, the exchanges in Philadelphia and New Brunswick appear to have catered for women who had seen better days and had now become self-supporting. At the time it was socially unacceptable for "genteel women" to work and the Women's Exchanges allowed them to sell their work anonymously. The managers and organizers of the exchanges added to their philanthropic status. These women were also able to use their entrepreneurial skills in a socially acceptable way.

Many exchanges added tearooms and lunchrooms, which provided more revenue and became fashionable meeting places for upper-class women. While almost all the exchanges were unsuccessful as businesses, they nevertheless set high standards for the items they accepted, charging a commission of only 10 percent on sales. Consumers were therefore able to benefit from an interesting selection of hand-made articles at interesting prices.

While many depositories and exchanges were local or regional operations, the Federation of Woman's Exchanges was established in 1934 and is still active. While the Woman's Exchange Movement continued through the twentieth century and some exchanges are still in business, the movement has faded, due to a changing work force, rising rents, and a resistance to high-priced, hand-made merchandise.

Select list of 19th-century Women's Exchanges
A table of Woman's Exchanges from 1832 through 1891 compiled from the 1891 publication Directory of Exchanges for Woman's Work and other sources.

Prominent women in the Exchange Movement

 Louisa May Alcott, founder of the Women's Educational and Industrial Union, Boston
 Sara Dary Armbruster, founder of the Woman's Exchange, Philadelphia
 Margaret W. Bartlett, founder of the Christian Woman's Exchange, New Orleans
 Ida Wikoff Baker, first president of the Woman's Exchange, Decatur, Illinois
 Mrs. G. Harmon Brown, founder of the Woman's Industrial Exchange, Baltimore
 Mary Atwater Choate, founder of the New York Exchange for Women's Work
 Harriet Clisby, founder of the Women's Educational and Industrial Union, Boston
 Elizabeth Bacon Custer, founder of the New York Exchange for Women's Work
 Abby Morton Diaz, founder of the Women's Educational and Industrial Union, Boston
 Julia Ward Howe, founder of the Women's Educational and Industrial Union, Boston
Grace Carew Sheldon, founder of the Woman's Exchange, Buffalo
 Candace Wheeler, founder of the New York Exchange for Women's Work

See also 
 Sarasota Woman's Exchange (founded 1962)

References

 
1832 establishments in Pennsylvania
Women in the United States
Women's organizations based in the United States